is a Japanese actress.

Career
Born in a rural area of Nara Prefecture, Ono was spotted by the film director Naomi Kawase cleaning out the shoe boxes at her junior high school, and cast in the lead role in Kawase's Suzaku, which earned the filmmaker the Camera d'Or at the 1997 Cannes Film Festival. Ono won the best actress award at the Singapore Film Festival for her role. After appearing in films by directors such as Shinji Aoyama, Akihiko Shiota, Nobuhiro Yamashita, and Isao Yukisada, Ono again starred in a Kawase film, The Mourning Forest, which won the Grand Prix at the 2007 Cannes Film Festival.

Also appearing on television, Ono was selected in an audition of 1850 actresses to play the coveted lead role in NHK's Asadora entitled Carnation which began broadcasting in October 2011.

Selected filmography

Film

Television

Dubbing
Minions: The Rise of Gru (Belle Bottom)

References

External links
 Official profile 
 

Japanese actresses
1981 births
Living people
Actors from Nara Prefecture
Asadora lead actors